Pokrovskoye (Şovde) is a rural locality (a selo) and the administrative centre of Pokrovsky Selsoviet, Khasavyurtovsky District, Republic of Dagestan, Russia. The population was 4,122 as of 2010. There are 61 streets.

Geography 
Pokrovskoye is located 12 km northeast of Khasavyurt (the district's administrative centre) by road. Batayurt is the nearest rural locality.

References 

Rural localities in Khasavyurtovsky District